Poudre Wilderness Volunteers (PWV) is a volunteer group that assists the Canyon Lakes Ranger District of the US Forest Service (USFS).  Poudre Wilderness Volunteers recruits and trains volunteers to serve as wilderness rangers and hosts for the purpose of educating the public and providing other support to the USFS.

Volunteers for PWV attend an offsite three-day training session every five years, and are asked to perform at least six patrols (hiking, backpacking, or on horseback) during each hiking season, which runs from January through September.  In addition to performing patrols, PWV volunteers perform other duties such as clearing weeds, trailhead hosting, and collecting forest usage data for the USFS.

Poudre Wilderness Volunteers is a 501(c)(3) non-profit and has no paid staff

Mission
The mission of Poudre Wilderness Volunteers is to assist the Canyon Lakes Ranger District of the United States Forest Service in managing and protecting wilderness and backcountry areas within its jurisdiction. To achieve this mission, Poudre Wilderness Volunteers recruits, trains, equips and fields citizen volunteers to serve as wilderness rangers and hosts for the purpose of educating the public, and provides other appropriate support to these wild areas.

Kids In Nature
The Kids in Nature (KIN) program connects kids with nature and fosters environmental awareness, respect, and land stewardship through fun educational programs and direct experience.

The project goals are to:
 Connect kids with nature via fun, hands-on experiences
 Educate kids about natural processes and wild animals and plants
 Encourage kids to respect natural areas and practice land stewardship
 Introduce kids to selected outdoor skills
 Instill a sense of wonder and appreciation for nature

The KIN program provides ranger-guided hikes with organizations and established groups. PWV leads small groups of children with their adult leaders or adult family members, enlightening them to the availability of the USFS land  teaching basic Leave No Trace skills as well as trail safety. PWV also will hold in-town sessions to help educate.

PWV has a ‘tool kit’ of activities that they can use, including map-and-compass lessons and always one of three interactive, in-depth curricula: "Aquatic Macroinvertebrates", "Mammals in Our Mountains" or "We Need Trees".

Most of the kids taken on a trail have never been in the mountains or on a trail before and they are all excited to be in our beautiful wild lands! We hike at the kid’s pace, stopping to smell, touch and explore the wonders of nature that interest the kids.

Trails and Trail Information
58 trails, organized by region and interest, providing maps, elevation profiles, and points of interest, are presented on the Trails pages 

Trails by Interest include:
 Stock Trails
 Bicycle Friendly Trails
 Dogs Off Leash Trails
 Hiking with kids

Trails by Area include:
 Big Thompson/Estes Park
 Lower Poudre Canyon
 Upper Poudre Canyon
 Pawnee Buttes
 Pingree Park Area
 Rawah Wilderness
 Red Feather Lakes Area

History
In 1995, a volunteer ranger for the USFS, Charles Bell, who patrolled the trails of what is now the Canyon Lakes Ranger District, became extremely worried about the cuts to the ranger district’s budget over the previous three years – from 3 full-time persons and 30 seasonal employees down to just 1 full-time person and 2 part-timers to look after its extensive backcountry and wilderness areas.

With USFS support, he decided to form a volunteer organization that was named Poudre Wilderness Volunteers (PWV) after the major river that flows through the district.

No organization magically springs, full-blown, into the world. Much planning, experimenting, trial and error, and gathering of information is involved. But before any of that happens, one person has to have an idea, an inspiration, which is so compelling that it must be pursued. In the case of the Poudre Wilderness Volunteers, that person is Chuck Bell. While volunteering for the Forest Service, he saw a vital need for ordinary citizens to assist the Forest Service in maintaining the wilderness.

Restoration Work
The Cameron Peak Fire in 2020 was the largest wildfire in Coloroado history. It destroyed and burned over 209,000 acres of the Roosevelt National Forest. With those flames came the destruction of the trails that allow us to experience the breathtaking beauty of our wilderness. 

For over 25 years, Poudre Wilderness Volunteers has been protecting and maintaining trails in the mountains along the Front Range. In 2021, the call was bigger than ever: to rebuild what was lost in the fires.

In 2021 over 200 members of the public and 50 PWV members came to the restoration workdays which resulted in 2400 hours of labor. PWV members did an additional 26 workdays in the burn area.

 3000 trees removed
 60 miles cleared of trees
 11 miles of drainage work on the tread

Media and Awards
 Denver7 Gives donates $15,000 to Poudre Wilderness Volunteers for wildfire restoration efforts
 CBS4’s Documentary ‘Scarred: Lessons from the Cameron Peak Fire’,  discusses the role Poudre Wilderness Volunteers plays in restoration of the fire/burn area
 CBS receives Emmy Award for article with references to Poudre Wilderness Volunteers
  CBS4: Volunteers Working To Rebuild Trails & Bridges Burned Down In Cameron Peak Fire
  FOX31 Denver - Local Volunteers repairing and restoring trails
  Coloradoan - Restoring Young Gulch Trail
  Coloradoan - Lion Gulch restoration

Larimer County awarded PWV the 2009 Environmental Stewardship Award on December 6, 2009.

Larimer County awarded PWV the 2020 Environmental Stewardship Award for its Kids in Nature program 

Larimer County awarded PWV the 2022 Environmental Stewardship Award

References

External links
 Poudre Wilderness Volunteers
Canyon Lakes Ranger District
 Sample Trail Description

Larimer County, Colorado
Environmental organizations based in Colorado
Roosevelt National Forest